Pandaung Township is a township in Pyay District in the Bago Region of Burma. The principal town is Pandaung.

References

Townships of the Bago Region
Pyay District